Mali Hrybovychi is a small village (selo), which has only 414, persons and is located in Lviv Raion, Lviv Oblast of Western Ukraine. It belongs to Lviv urban hromada, one of the hromadas of Ukraine.

Local government is administered by Hrybovytska village council.The first record of the village dates back to 1440 year, but by archaeological excavations have revealed a settlement of the Stone Age (third millennium BC).

Until 18 July 2020, Mali Hrybovychi belonged to Zhovkva Raion. The raion was abolished in July 2020 as part of the administrative reform of Ukraine, which reduced the number of raions of Lviv Oblast to seven. The area of Zhovkva Raion was merged into Lviv Raion.

References

External links 
 village Mali Hrybovychi
 Чорна гора над Львовом: городище енеоліту та святилище слов’ян. Borys Javir
 weather.in.ua

Villages in Lviv Raion